Ang Asosasyon Sang Mangunguma Nga Bisaya-Owa Mangunguma, Inc., also known as the AAMBIS-Owa Party List, is a political organization based in Western Visayas with representation in the House of Representatives of the Philippines. It aims to represent the interest of Filipino farmers.

History

18th Congress
Ang Asosasyon Sang Mangunguma Nga Bisaya-Owa Mangunguma (AAMBIS-Owa Party-list) participated in the 2019 House of Representatives elections where it won a seat for the 18th Congress. As a party-list it stated constituents are Filipino farmers. Sharon Garin, who has been AAMBIS-Owa's representative since 2010 in the 15th Congress, retained her seat in the House of Representatives. Garin belongs to a political family, with her cousin Jimmy Garin also a partylist nominee for the 2019 election and her husband Richard Garin a former congressman himself.

As representative, Garin proposed various measures concerning agriculture. She filed a bill proposing the amendment of the Customs Modernization and Tariffication Act (CMTA) which would enable the government to better deal with agricultural smuggling and improve trade facilitation. Garin also filed a legislation which proposed the regulation of e-cigarettes to protect the interest of tobacco farmers which also would mandate labels and health warnings to such products.

The partylist also facilitated the of the Department of Labor and Employment's Tulong Panghanapbuhay sa Ating Disadvantaged/Displaced Workers (TUPAD) program in the Western Visayas, although AAMBIS-Owa itself did not fund the program.

Electoral performance

Representatives to Congress

External links

References

Party-lists represented in the House of Representatives of the Philippines
Political organizations based in the Philippines
Agrarian parties in the Philippines